Wennington Hall is a former country house in Wennington, a village in the City of Lancaster district in Lancashire, England. The house is a Grade II listed building and was  occupied by Wennington Hall School until 31 August 2022, the site is now subject to tender, after the LEA were unable to secure academic status.

History
In its early history, Wennington Hall was the seat of William de Wennington. and in the 14th century, it passed to the Morley family. In 1674 the hall was sold to Henry Marsden, MP for Clitheroe. It descended to Henry Marsden, who lived at the hall with his younger brother John, known as "Silly Marsden", and their aunt. Henry died in 1780 from alcoholism and John was induced by his guardian aunt and her ambitious husband to sell the hall and buy Hornby Castle, Lancashire. Wennington was bought in 1788 by the Rev Anthony Lister, who took the surname Marsden. The hall was later sold to Richard Saunders in 1841.

The present building on the site, designed by Lancaster architect Edward Graham Paley, was constructed in 1855–56 for Richard's son William Allen Francis Saunders, High Sheriff of Lancashire in 1862. After him it passed to Charles Morley Saunders and later William Morley Saunders. During the Second World War it housed the Wennington School, who moved to Ingmanthorpe Hall in Yorkshire at the end of the war.

It is now a Lancashire Authority boarding school, Wennington Hall School, which was founded in 1954 for boys with learning or behavioural difficulties.

Wennington Hall was designated as a Grade II listed building on 4 December 1985. The Grade II designation—the lowest of the three grades—is for buildings that are "nationally important and of special interest".

Architecture
Wennington Hall is built of sandstone rubble. Most of the roofs are stone slate. The plan is asymmetric and there is a large crenellated tower to the rear. The front facade is gabled. The house is in two storeys, and is in Tudor Revival style. Inside the house is a staircase hall with a hammerbeam roof, and stained glass.  Connected to the main building, there is a stable block that has its own crenellated tower. The main section of the building is in Tudor revival style with wooden beams going across the ceiling of the central section of the building. The main door still remains in its original form and has been treated with care, the walls of the grounds still also remain in their original forms.

See also

Listed buildings in Wennington, Lancashire
List of works by Sharpe and Paley

References

Citations

Sources

 

Buildings and structures in the City of Lancaster
Country houses in Lancashire
E. G. Paley buildings
Grade II listed buildings in Lancashire
Schools in the City of Lancaster